Harald Starzengruber (born 11 April 1981 in Leogang) is an Austrian cyclist, who last rode for Union Raiffeisen Radteam Tyrol. He won the Austrian National Road Race Championships in 2010.

Palmares

Road

2000
 U23 National Road Race Champion
3rd U23 National Time Trial Championships
2004
1st Memorial Carlo Valentini
2005
1st Coppa Colli Briantei Internazionale
2006
1st Bürgenland Rundfahrt
2007
3rd Völkermarkter Radsporttage
2008
3rd National Time Trial Championships
2009
1st Giro di Festina Schwanenstadt
2010
 National Road Race Champion

Cyclo-Cross
2000-2001
 National U23 Cyclo-Cross Champion
2002-2003
 National U23 Cyclo-Cross Champion

References

1981 births
Living people
Austrian male cyclists